Marco Antonio Girón (26 March 1926 – 2012) was a Guatemalan wrestler. He competed in two events at the 1952 Summer Olympics.

References

External links
 

1926 births
2012 deaths
Guatemalan male sport wrestlers
Olympic wrestlers of Guatemala
Wrestlers at the 1952 Summer Olympics
Place of birth missing